Kabutar Khan or Kabutarkhan may refer to:
 Kabutar Khan, Kerman
 Kabutar Khan-e Olya, Khuzestan Province
 Kabutar Khan-e Sofla, Khuzestan Province
 Kabutar Khan Rural District, in Kerman Province